The People's Deputies of Ukraine of the 5th convocation were elected in the snap parliamentary elections on March 26, 2006. The elections were held under the proportional system according to electoral lists of political parties and electoral blocks of political parties in Ukraine. The 5th convocation ended on June 5, 2007 (six weeks after the 2007 parliamentary elections).

According to the results of early elections the following political forces got in the Verkhovna Rada:
 Party of Regions with 32.14% of votes
 Yulia Tymoshenko Bloc, BYuT with 22.29%
 Our Ukraine Bloc with 13.95%
 Socialist Party of Ukraine (SPU) with 5.69%
 Communist Party of Ukraine (CPU) with 3.66%

Together, these political forces gathered around 88.58% of the votes. All other political parties and blocks do not pass the electoral threshold of 3%. 2,73% of electors voted "against all".


Members

See also 
 2006 Ukrainian parliamentary election

References

Parliamentary election
2006-2007
 
5th Ukrainian Verkhovna Rada